Events from the year 1953 in the United States.

Incumbents

Federal Government 
 President: Harry S. Truman (D-Missouri) (until January 20), Dwight D. Eisenhower (R-Kansas/New York) (starting January 20)
 Vice President: Alben W. Barkley (D-Kentucky) (until January 20), Richard Nixon (R-California) (starting January 20)
 Chief Justice: Fred M. Vinson (Kentucky) (died September 8), Earl Warren (California) (starting October 5)
 Speaker of the House of Representatives: Sam Rayburn (D-Texas) (until January 3), Joseph William Martin, Jr. (R-Massachusetts) (starting January 3)
 Senate Majority Leader:
 until January 3: Ernest McFarland (D-Arizona)
 January 3 – July 31: Robert A. Taft (R-Ohio)
 starting August 3: William F. Knowland (R-California)
 Congress: 82nd (until January 3), 83rd (starting January 3)

Events

January–March

 January 7 – President Harry S. Truman announces the United States has developed a hydrogen bomb.
 January 14 – The CIA-sponsored Robertson Panel first meets to discuss the UFO phenomenon.
 January 19 – 68% of all television sets in the United States are tuned into I Love Lucy to watch Lucille Ball give birth.
 January 20 – Dwight D. Eisenhower is sworn in as the 34th President of the United States, and Richard Nixon is sworn in as Vice President of the United States.
 January 22 – The Crucible, a historical drama by Arthur Miller written as an allegory of McCarthyism, opens on Broadway.
 February 1 – WEEK-TV begins broadcasting in Peoria, Illinois.
 February 5 – Walt Disney's 14th animated film, Peter Pan, premieres in Chicago. It is Disney's final film to be distributed by RKO.
 February 11 – President Dwight D. Eisenhower refuses a clemency appeal for Ethel and Julius Rosenberg.
 February 13 – Transsexual Christine Jorgensen returns to New York after successful sexual reassignment surgery in Denmark.
 February 19 – Georgia approves the first literature censorship board in the U.S.
 March 19 – The 25th Academy Awards ceremony, emceed by Conrad Nagel, is simultaneously held at RKO Pantages Theatre in Hollywood, Los Angeles (hosted by Bob Hope) and at NBC International Theatre in New York (hosted by Fredric March). It is the first ceremony to be televised. Cecil B. DeMille's The Greatest Show on Earth wins Best Motion Picture, while Fred Zinnemann's High Noon, John Huston's Moulin Rouge and John Ford's The Quiet Man all receive the most nominations with seven, with Ford receiving his third Best Director win. Vincente Minnelli's The Bad and the Beautiful wins the most awards with five.
 March 31 – Due to increasingly lower ridership, Staten Island Rapid Transit closes two of its three-passenger lines (South Beach & North Shore).

April–June
 April 11 – The Department of Health, Education, and Welfare begins operations, the first new Cabinet-level department since the Department of Labor's formation in 1913.
 May 11 – The 1953 Waco tornado outbreak: an F5 tornado hits in the downtown section of Waco, Texas, killing 114.
 May 25 – Nuclear testing: at the Nevada Test Site, the United States conducts its first and only nuclear artillery test: Upshot–Knothole Grable.
 June 8 – Flint–Worcester tornado outbreak sequence: a tornado kills 115 in Flint, Michigan (the last to claim more than 100 lives).
 June 9
CIA Technical Services Staff head Sidney Gottlieb approves of the use of LSD in a MKULTRA subproject.
Flint–Worcester tornado outbreak sequence: a tornado spawned from the same storm system as the Flint tornado hits in Worcester, Massachusetts, killing 94.
 June 19 
 Julius and Ethel Rosenberg are executed at Sing Sing Prison in New York for conspiracy to commit espionage.
 The Baton Rouge bus boycott begins in the Southern United States.
 June 30 – Assembly of the first Chevrolet Corvette is completed in Flint, Michigan.

July–September
 July 18 – Howard Hawks's musical film Gentlemen Prefer Blondes, starring Marilyn Monroe and Jane Russell, is released by 20th Century Fox.
 July 26 – The Short Creek raid is carried out on a polygynous Mormon sect in Arizona.
 July 27 – The Korean War ends: The United States, the People's Republic of China, North Korea and South Korea sign an armistice agreement.
 July 28 – Burger King opens its first restaurant in Jacksonville, Florida.
 August 5 – Operation Big Switch: U.S. prisoners of war are repatriated after the Korean War.
 August 17 – The first planning session of Narcotics Anonymous is held in Southern California. Its first meeting is held October 5.
 August 18 – The second Kinsey Report, Sexual Behavior in the Human Female, on American sexual habits, is issued.
 August 19 – Cold War: 1953 Iranian coup d'état ("Operation Ajax") – The CIA helps to overthrow the democratic government of Mohammed Mossadegh in Iran and retain Shah Mohammad Reza Pahlavi on the throne.
 August 20 – The U.S. returns to West Germany 382 ships it had captured during World War II.
 September 9 – The Supreme Court decision in Rumely v. United States affirms that indirect lobbying in the U.S. by distribution of books intended to influence opinion is a public good and not subject to regulation by Congress.
 September 12 – U.S. Senator John Fitzgerald Kennedy marries Jacqueline Lee Bouvier at St. Mary's Church in Newport, Rhode Island.
 September 28 – Six year old boy Bobby Greenlease is kidnapped in Kansas City, Missouri and murdered in Lenexa, Kansas, despite his father paying the largest ever ransom payment in American history at the time.

October–December
 October 5
 Earl Warren is appointed Chief Justice of the United States by U.S. president Dwight D. Eisenhower.
 The New York Yankees defeat the Brooklyn Dodgers, 4 games to 2, to win their 16th World Series title in baseball.
 October 10 – Mutual Defense Treaty Between the United States and the Republic of Korea is concluded in Washington D.C.
 October 12 – The play The Caine Mutiny Court-Martial opens at Plymouth Theatre, New York.
 October 15 – Tito Jackson, member of the Jacksons and brother of Michael Jackson
 October 19 – Fahrenheit 451, by Ray Bradbury, is published
 October 30 – Cold War: U.S. President Dwight D. Eisenhower formally approves the top secret document of the United States National Security Council NSC 162/2, which states that the United States' arsenal of nuclear weapons must be maintained and expanded to counter the communist threat.
 December – Hugh Hefner publishes the first issue of Playboy magazine: it sells 54,175 copies at $.50 each.
 December 6 – With the NBC Symphony Orchestra, conductor Arturo Toscanini performs what he claims is his favorite Beethoven symphony, Eroica, for the last time. The live performance is broadcast nationwide on radio, and later released on records and CD.
 December 8 – U.S. president Dwight D. Eisenhower delivers his Atoms for Peace address to the UN General Assembly in New York City.
 December 18 – Carl Hall and Bonnie Brown are both executed in the Missouri gas chamber after pleading guilty to the Murder and kidnapping of six year old Bobby Greenlease; she is the third woman in history (and last until 2021) to be executed by federal authorities.
 December 25 – Amami Islands are returned to Japan after 8 years of United States Military occupation.

Date unknown
 Harold Butler and his first partner open Danny's Donuts (later Denny's) in Lakewood, California.
 Swanson introduce the TV dinner.
 In the fall of 1953, the Redding Drag Strip in California is accepted by the National Hot Rod Association.

Ongoing
 Cold War (1947–1991)
 Second Red Scare (1947–1957)
 Korean War (1950–1953)

Births

January
 January 1 
Gary Johnson, 29th Governor of New Mexico, Libertarian Party nominee for President.
Lynn Jones, baseball player and coach
 January 2 – Vincent Racaniello, virologist, author and academic
 January 4 – James Warren, journalist and publisher
 January 5 – Steve Archer, singer-songwriter and producer
 January 6 – Danny Pearson, singer (died 2018)  
 January 8 – Bruce Sutter, baseball pitcher (died 2022)
 January 11 – Jim Clendenen, winemaker (died 2021)
 January 13 – Luann Ryon, archer
 January 15 
 Kent Hovind, Christian fundamentalist evangelist and tax protester
 Randy White, American football player
 January 17 – Mark Littell, baseball player (died 2022)
 January 19 – Desi Arnaz Jr., actor and musician  
 January 20 – Jeffrey Epstein, financier and sex offender (died 2019)
 January 21
 Paul Allen, entrepreneur and co-founder of Microsoft (died 2018)
 Glenn Kaiser, Christian blues-rock, heavy metal and R&B singer-songwriter and guitarist  
 January 23 – Robin Zander, singer and guitarist (Cheap Trick)
 January 24 – Tim Stoddard, baseball player and coach
 January 29 
Nate Barnett, basketball player
Caesar Cervin, soccer player and coach
Dennis Delaney, actor and playwright
Paul Fusco, puppeteer and voice actor
Steve March-Tormé, singer-songwriter
Louie Pérez, singer-songwriter and guitarist
Dwight Takamine, lawyer and politician
Charlie Wilson, singer-songwriter; producer (The Gap Band)

February
 February 3 – Ron Williamson, baseball player wrongly convicted of rape and murder (died 2004)
 February 7 – Dan Quisenberry, baseball player and poet (died 1998)
 February 11 – Jeb Bush, 43rd Governor of Florida from 1999 to 2007, second son of President George H. W. Bush and Barbara Bush; younger brother of President George W. Bush
 February 15 – John Goodsall, guitarist 
 February 19 – Herb Lusk, American football player (died 2022)

March
 March 1 – Luther Strange, U.S. Senator from Alabama from 2017 to 2018
 March 2 – Russ Feingold, U.S. Senator from Wisconsin from 1993 to 2011
 March 5 – Michael Sandel, political philosopher
 March 6 – Jacklyn Zeman, actress
 March 13 – Michael Curry, presiding bishop of the Episcopal Church from 2015
 March 26 – Lincoln Chafee, U.S. Senator from Rhode Island from 1999 to 2007

April
 April 9
 Hal Ketchum, country singer-songwriter (died 2020)
 Stephen Paddock, mass murderer (died 2017)
 April 16
Douglas M. Fraser, general
J. Neil Schulman, author, actor, director and producer
 April 20 – Carrie Mae Weems, photographer
 April 26 
 Brian Binnie, naval officer and test pilot (died 2022)
 Linda Thompson, lawyer and conspiracy theorist (died 2009)

May
 May 12 – Kevin Grevey, basketball player and sportscaster
 May 26 
 Kay Hagan, U.S. Senator from North Carolina from 2009 to 2015
 Dan Roundfield, basketball player (died 2012)
 May 29 
 Dennis Franks, footballer (died 2021)
 Big Daddy Graham, comedian and radio host (died 2021)
 Philip E. Sakowitz Jr., Vice President, national retail sales, federal government and military

June
 June 2 – Cornel West, philosopher and political activist
 June 10 – John Edwards, U.S. Senator from North Carolina from 1999 to 2005
 June 11 – Barbara Minty, model
 June 13 – Tim Allen, comedian, actor, voice-over artist and entertainer
 June 18 – Bruce Seals, basketball player (died 2020)

July
 July 6 
 Nanci Griffith, country folk singer-songwriter (died 2021)
 Mike Riley, football head coach
 July 15 – Alvin Neelley, murderer (died 2005)
 July 19 - Howard Schultz, Starbucks CEO
 July 24 – Claire McCaskill, U.S. Senator from Missouri from 2007 to 2019
 July 28 – Don Black, white supremacist

August
 August 6 – Paolo Bacigalupi, author
 August 8 – Don Most, actor and director
 August 19 – Mary Matalin, political consultant
 August 31 – Marcia Clark, prosecutor

September
 September 4 – Lawrence Hilton-Jacobs, African-American actor  
 September 6 – Anne Lockhart, actress
 September 8 – Stu Ungar, poker player (d. 1998)
 September 11 
 Tommy Shaw, guitarist and singer 
 Lesley Visser, sportscaster and journalist 
 September 19 – Jennifer Kilian, American-Dutch translator
 September 21 – Andrew Heermans, musician, recording engineer and music producer
 September 24 – Peter Halley, painter and educator
 September 30 – Deborah Allen, singer

October
 October 15 
 Tito Jackson, singer-songwriter and guitarist 
 Larry Miller, actor and screenwriter
 Walter Jon Williams, author
 October 24 – Steven Hatfill, physician and virologist
 October 25 – Ajamu Baraka, human rights activist and the Green Party's nominee for Vice President of the United States in the 2016 election
 October 28 – Desmond Child, songwriter and producer

November
 November 14 – Phil Baron, voice actor, puppeteer and songwriter
 November 15 – James Widdoes, actor, director and producer
 November 18 - Kath Soucie, voice actress
 November 25 – Katherine Zappone, human rights activist and independent politician in the Republic of Ireland
 November 27 – Steve Bannon, media executive and political strategist

December
 December 6
Tom Hulce, actor 
Dwight Stones, high jumper and sportscaster
Gary Ward, baseball player and coach
 December 10 – Chris Bury, journalist and academic
 December 22
 David Leisner, guitarist and composer
 Bern Nadette Stanis, African-American actress 
 December 27 – Sheila Dixon, Democrat mayor of Baltimore and criminal
 December 30
 Dana Key  Christian musician, guitarist and preacher (died 2010) 
 Meredith Vieira, journalist and game show host

Deaths

 January 1 – Hank Williams, country singer-songwriter (born 1923)
 January 7 – Osa Johnson, adventurer and filmmaker, wife of Martin Johnson (born 1894)
 March 12 – James Hard, last verified living Union combat veteran of the American Civil War (born 1842)
 May 30 – Dooley Wilson, African American actor, singer and drummer (born 1886)
 June 3 – Florence Price, African American classical composer (born 1887)
 August 7 – Abner Powell, Major League Baseball player (born 1860)
 September 2 – Jonathan M. Wainwright, general (born 1883)
 September 5
 Francis Ford, actor and director (born 1881)
 Rudolf Höber, German-American physician (born 1873)
 September 8 – Fred M. Vinson, Chief Justice of the U.S. (born 1890)
 September 13 – Mary Brewster Hazelton, portrait painter (born 1868)
 September 28 – Edwin Hubble, astronomer (born 1889)
 October 3 – Florence R. Sabin, medical scientist (born 1871)
 October 11 – Pauline Robinson Bush, younger sister of US President George W. Bush (born 1949)
 November 18 – Ruth Crawford Seeger, modernist composer and folk music arranger (born 1901)
 November 21 – Larry Shields, dixieland jazz clarinetist (born 1893)
 November 27 – Eugene O'Neill, playwright (born 1888)
 December 14 – Marjorie Kinnan Rawlings, novelist (born 1896)
 December 19 – Robert Andrews Millikan, physicist Nobel Prize laureate (born 1868)
 December 21 – Nicholas H. Heck, geophysicist, oceanographer and surveyor (born 1882)
 December 29 – Violet MacMillan, Broadway theater actress (born 1887)

See also
 List of American films of 1953
 Timeline of United States history (1950–1969)

References

External links
 

 
1950s in the United States
United States
United States
Years of the 20th century in the United States